The 2007 Asian Junior Badminton Championships were held in Kuala Lumpur, Malaysia from 15–22 July.

Venue
This tournament was held at Stadium Juara, Bukit Kiara Sports Complex, Kuala Lumpur.

Medalists

Medal table

References 

Badminton Asia Junior Championships
Asian Junior Badminton Championships
Asian Junior Badminton Championships
International sports competitions hosted by Malaysia
2007 in youth sport